Saffa or SAFFA may refer to:
Saffa, Ramallah, a Palestinian town in the West Bank
 or Swiss Exhibition for Women's Work, exhibitions held in Switzerland in 1928 and 1958
a colloquial expression for a person from South Africa

People with the surname
Aishath Saffa (born 1989), Maldivian volleyball player

See also
Safa (disambiguation)
Saffer, a surname